Bamus Volcano is a volcano on New Britain near Ulawun. It last erupted in 1886. 

It is classified as a stratovolcano and noted to have a breached crater.

External links

Bamus

References

Stratovolcanoes of Papua New Guinea
Volcanoes of New Britain
Holocene stratovolcanoes